Potomak (Serbo-Croatian for "descendant") is an artist record label for the German experimental rock band Einstürzende Neubauten (Potomak on Discogs). It was founded by the band's front man Blixa Bargeld (born Christian Emmerich on January 12, 1959) in 1988 to support the re-release of the band's Kollaps album on CD format. It also enabled the band to assume ownership of their music and operate outside of a label contract. Potomak also serves as the label for band member's solo projects and has released albums from Alexander Hacke, Rudolph Moser and Blixa Bargeld. Potomak releases are distributed through Rykodisc and Indigo.

Discography
2008 	Einstürzende Neubauten 	The Jewels 	(CD, Album, Enh, RE, Eco)
2008 	Einstürzende Neubauten 	The Jewels 	(LP, Album)
2008   Alexander Hacke & Danielle de Picciotto 	The Ship Of Fools 	(CD, CD/) 
2008   Rudolph Moser 	Moser 	(CD, Album)
2008 	Blixa Bargeld 	Commissioned Music 	(CD, Comp, RE, RM, Dig) 	
2007	Einstürzende Neubauten 	Jewels 	(File, MP3, Album, WAV) 
2007 Einstürzende Neubauten 	Weil Weil Weil 	(File, MP3) 	
2007 	Einstürzende Neubauten 	Alles Wieder Offen 	(CD, Enh, Album, Promo) 	
2007 	Einstürzende Neubauten 	Alles Wieder Offen 	(CD, Album, Ltd) 	
2007 	Einstürzende Neubauten	Alles Wieder Offen 	(CD, Album) 	
2007 	Einstürzende Neubauten	Weil Weil Weil 	(CD, Maxi) 	
2007	Einstürzende Neubauten 	Alles Wieder Offen 	(2xLP, Album, Gat) 	
2003   Einstürzende Neubauten 	Kollaps 	(CD)
2002   Einstürzende Neubauten 	Fuenf Auf Der Nach Oben Offenen Richterskala 	(CD, Album, RE)  		
2002   Einstürzende Neubauten 	Zeichnungen Des Patienten O.T. / Drawings Of Patient O.T. 	(CD, Album, RM) 	
2002   Einstürzende Neubauten 	Haus Der Lüge 	(CD, Album, RM, Dig) 	
2002   Einstürzende Neubauten 	9-15-2000, Brussels 	(2xCD, Dig) 	
2002	Einstürzende Neubauten 	1/2 Mensch 	(CD, Album, RE) 	
2002 	Einstürzende Neubauten	Zeichnungen Des Patienten O.T. (Drawings Of Patient O.T.) 	(LP) 	
2002   Einstürzende Neubauten 	Haus Der Lüge 	(LP, Album, RE) 	
2002   Einstürzende Neubauten 	Kollaps 	(LP, RE) 	
2002   Einstürzende Neubauten 	1/2 Mensch 	(LP, Album, RE) 	
2002  	Einstürzende Neubauten 	Fünf Auf Der Nach Oben Offenen Richterskala 	(LP)
1997   Ninos con Bombas 	El Niño 	(CD, Album)
1989	Pig 	Sick City / Shit For Brains 	(12", Single) 	
1988   Einstürzende Neubauten 	Kollaps 	(CD)

MUSTERHAUS Series
2007 MUSTERHAUS 8 	Einstürzende Neubauten 	Weingeister 	(CD, Enh, Dig)	
2006 MUSTERHAUS 7 	Einstürzende Neubauten 	Stimmen Reste 	(CD, Album, Dig) 
2006 MUSTERHAUS 6 	Einstürzende Neubauten 	Klaviermusik 	(CD)
2006 MUSTERHAUS 5 	Einstürzende Neubauten 	Kassetten 	(CD)
2006 MUSTERHAUS 4 	Redux Orchestra versus Einstürzende Neubauten 	Redux Orchestra versus Einstürzende Neubauten 	(CD, Album)
2006 MUSTERHAUS 3 	Einstürzende Neubauten 	Solo Bassfeder - Komposition 	(CD) 	
2005 MUSTERHAUS 2 	Einstürzende Neubauten	Unglaublicher Laerm 	(CD, Dig) 
2005 MUSTERHAUS 1 	Einstürzende Neubauten 	Anarchitektur 	(CD, Album)

Supporter Project
2007 	Einstürzende Neubauten 	Alles Wieder Offen (Supporter Edition) 	(CD, Album, Ltd, Dig)
2005 	Einstürzende Neubauten 	Grundstueck (Supporters' Album #2) 	(CD + DVD) 	
2005  	Einstürzende Neubauten 	Grundstueck (Supporters' Album #2) 	(CD, Album)

DVD/Video
2007 	Einstürzende Neubauten 	3 Jewels 	(DVD, PAL, NTSC) 
2005 	Einstürzende Neubauten 	1/2 Mensch 	(DVD + CD) 
2005 	Einstürzende Neubauten	1/2 Mensch 	(DVD)

German record labels